The three grand soups of  the world ( sekai sandai sūpu) is a common term in Japan referring to three types of soup thought to be the best in the world. The origin of this term is unknown, though it was already in use by the 1980s. Notwithstanding the term, there are four soups referred to as "three grand soups." This is because borscht and tom yam kung are considered to be tied for 3rd place.

List

See also

 List of soups

References 

Japanese cuisine